Mehtap Ar (6 April 1956 – 10 April 2021) was a Turkish actress.

She started acting at the Lale Oraloğlu theater. Later she continued acting in Nejat Uygur and Tevfik Gelenbe theaters. She began her cinema career with the 1974 film . She also played in the 1980 film . She has appeared in over 50 films and TV series.

Ar died at the Koç University Hospital in Istanbul on 10 April 2021, aged 64, from organ failure where she was treated for lung cancer. Two days later, she was buried at Zincirlikuyu Cemetery, next to her mother Aysel Gürel.

References

20th-century Turkish actresses
Turkish stage actresses
Turkish film actresses
Turkish television actresses
1956 births
2021 deaths
Actresses from Istanbul
Deaths from organ failure
Burials at Zincirlikuyu Cemetery